Kubang may refer to:
 Kubang Kerian, a town in Malaysia
 Kubang Pasu, a district in Malaysia
 Maserati Kubang, a crossover SUV